The Hilly Hundred is an annual, two-day, non-competitive bicycle tour through Morgan, Monroe and Owen Counties in south-central Indiana.  It consists of two days of approximately 50-mile routes, for a total of one hundred miles in a weekend.  There is also a 40-mile option for the second-day route.  The event draws upwards of 5,000 cycling enthusiasts from around the country.

The ride is through rolling country hills, with both steep climbs and downhills.  Along the route are several rest stops, which offer live bands and free food for registered participants. This is meant to create a friendly and open atmosphere amongst the cyclists.

History 

The Hilly Hundred was first created by Hartley Alley, Bernard Clayton, and Tom Prebys as a two-day, one-hundred-mile ride through central Indiana. It was sponsored by the Southern Indiana Bicycle Touring Association (SIBTA). The first ride started with 54 riders heading out from Bloomington on June 15, 1968

By 1979, the Hilly had grown to 1,900 registered riders, and sponsorship had been handed over to the Central Indiana Bicycling Association (CIBA).

In 1982, about 2,800 riders participated, so a staggered start was adopted to cope with the large number and for safety and, in 1995, a limit of 5,000 riders was adopted, to make sure there would not be too many bicyclists to work with for any given year.

The Hilly Hundred changed its headquarters to new facilities in Ellettsville, Indiana in 2003.

Communications 

Communications at the event are provided by volunteer amateur radio operators, usually consisting of many members of the Bloomington Amateur Radio Club and K9IU, as well as other hams from the region.  Hams accompany SAGs (rescue vehicles) and a station is present at each rest stop.  An effort is made for every station, especially the SAGs, to include an APRS unit, which beacons their location for use by net control.

Communications are run through a directed net.  Net control is located in Ellettsville at Edgewood High School, and it coordinates all ham radio traffic and SAGs for the event.  In recent years, the net has run on the WB9TLH 2m repeater, which is located on the Indiana University, Bloomington campus.

Cell phones are not used as the primary mode of communication, partly because coverage is poor or non-existent along many stretches of the tour, and partly because it was decided to be beneficial that all traffic be open.  Reasoning for communications traffic being open includes benefits such as everyone involved knowing what's going on elsewhere, and important announcements and other information not needing to be repeated.

Other Volunteers 

Other volunteers involved in the Hilly Hundred include medics, who are usually registered nurses.  Local law enforcement is also often present to deal with traffic problems created by the event.

External links
 

Bicycle tours
Recurring sporting events established in 1968
Tourist attractions in Greene County, Indiana
Tourist attractions in Monroe County, Indiana
Tourist attractions in Owen County, Indiana
Cycling in Indiana
Cycling events in the United States
1968 establishments in Indiana